The UCI Golden Bike is a series of Cyclosportive cycling races.  At present it consists of 7 events in 7 countries – 5 in Europe, 1 in Africa and 1 in Oceania – all selected by the International Cycling Union (UCI) as being the best cycling for all events in the world. 

The UCI Golden Bike series was created in 1999 to encourage cyclists to live their passion outside of their country and enable them to discover new horizons, in terms of both sport and culture. 

The current events include:

 - Cape Argus Pick n Pay Cycle Tour 

 - De Ronde van Vlaanderen

 - Gran Fondo Internazionale Felice Gimondi

 - Quebrantahuesos

 - Cyclosportive l’Ariégeoise 

 - Gruyère Cycling Tour

 - Lake Taupo Cycle Challenge

External links
 UCI Golden Bike official website 

Golden Bike
Cyclosportives